Jonathan "Jon" Hardy (born 2 October 1960 in Nakuru, Kenya) is a Kenyan born former English cricketer. Hardy was a left-handed batsman.

Hardy signed for his first club Hampshire in 1983, making his first-class debut against Cambridge University and his List-A debut against Leicestershire. He scored 94* on his championship debut v's Somerset. Hardy spent three seasons with the club before leaving at the end of the 1985 season.

In 1986 Hardy signed for Somerset, where he would spend five seasons, playing 87 first-class matches and 63 one-day matches for the county. After the 1986 English county season Hardy signed for Western Province in South Africa. Hardy spent four seasons playing for Western Province.

Hardy left Somerset in 1990, signing instead for Gloucestershire for the 1991 County Championship season. Hardy spent just one unsuccessful season with the county before being released after the 1991 season. From 1992 to 1998 Hardy played in the Minor Counties Championship for Dorset, representing the county in one-day matches in the NatWest Trophy. Hardy's last one-day match came against Hampshire, the county he first joined in 1983. At the end of the 1998 season Hardy retired from all forms of cricket.

External links
Jon Hardy on Cricinfo
Jon Hardy on CricketArchive
Matches and detailed statistics for Jon Hardy

1960 births
Living people
English cricketers
Hampshire cricketers
Somerset cricketers
Western Province cricketers
Gloucestershire cricketers
Dorset cricketers
Dorset cricket captains